Carex silicea, known as beach sedge, is a species of sedge native to North America. It is found in the northeastern United States and southeastern Canada.

References

silicea
Flora of North America
Taxa named by Stephen Thayer Olney